Abdirashid Haji Duale Qambi is a Somali politician, who is currently serving as the Minister of Public Works and Housing of Somaliland. He is a long time standing politician and held many political positions since Somaliland declared its independence in 1991.

See also

 Ministry of Employment, Social and Family Affairs (Somaliland)
 Politics of Somaliland
 List of Somaliland politicians

References

Peace, Unity, and Development Party politicians
Living people
Government ministers of Somaliland
1963 births